Palaeophanes is a genus of moths in the family Arrhenophanidae.

The generic name is derived from the Greek palaios (meaning ancient or old) and phanes (from
Phaino, meaning shine or appear), in reference to its Old World distribution as well as its current basal position within the family.

Species
 Palaeophanes lativalva Davis, 2003
 Palaeophanes taiwanensis Davis, 2003
 Palaeophanes brevispina Davis, 2003
 Palaeophanes xoutha Davis, 2003

External links
Family Arrhenophanidae

Arrhenophanidae